Harry Creber (30 April 1872 – 27 March 1939) was an English cricketer active from 1898 to 1922 who played for Glamorgan. He was born in Birkenhead and died in Swansea. He appeared in 34 first-class matches as a righthanded batsman who bowled left arm medium pace. He scored 157 runs with a highest score of 13* and took 98 wickets with a best performance of seven for 47.

Notes

1872 births
1939 deaths
English cricketers
Glamorgan cricketers
South Wales cricketers